Undeniable is a 2008 album by The Chipmunks.  Its release was connected to the version of the Alvin and the Chipmunks franchise from the 2007 film Alvin and the Chipmunks, but contains no music from the film. It was released on November 4, 2008, as the follow-up to the Alvin and the Chipmunks: Original Motion Picture Soundtrack.

The album features remakes to some of their old hits as well as some new covers, such as the theme song to the 1980s television series of the same name.

Track listing 
"We're The Chipmunks" (DeeTown Remix)* (Janice Karman, Chris Caswell, Jason Honingford, Ali Dee Theodore)
"Shake Your Groove Thing" feat. Drew Seeley (Peaches & Herb) (Dino Fekaris, Freddie Perren)
"Livin' on a Prayer" (Bon Jovi) (Jon Bon Jovi, Richie Sambora, Desmond Child)
"Three Little Birds" (Bob Marley) (Bob Marley)
"Thank You"* (Ali Dee Theodore, Sarai Howard, Zach Danziger, Ross Bagdasarian Jr., Jason Bonham, Luis Resto)
"All the Small Things" (Blink-182) (Mark Hoppus, Tom DeLonge, Travis Barker)
"Acceptance"* (Ali Dee Theodore, Sarai Howard, Zach Danziger, Ross Bagdasarian Jr., Chris Classic)
"Don't Stop Believin'" (Journey) (Jonathan Cain, Steve Perry, Neal Schon)
"Ho Ho Ho"* (Janice Karman)
"Rock and Roll" (Led Zeppelin) (Jimmy Page, Robert Plant, John Paul Jones, John Bonham)
"Home" (Daughtry) (Chris Daughtry)
"Undeniable"* (Ali Dee Theodore, Sarai Howard, Zach Danziger, Ross Bagdasarian Jr.)
"We're The Chipmunks"* (Janice Karman, Chris Caswell)
"Time Warp" (The Rocky Horror Show) (Richard O'Brien, Richard Hartley)

* - denotes original Chipmunk song

Personnel
Vinny Alfieri - guitar, member of attributed artist
Ali "Dee" Theodore - audio production, executive producer
Justin Long - primary artist (as Alvin Seville)
Matthew Gray Gubler - primary artist (as Simon Seville)
Jesse McCartney - primary artist (as Theodore Seville)
Ross Bagdasarian Jr. - audio production, cover design, dialogue, executive producer, producer
Chris Classic - primary artist (as DJ)
Alana Da Fonseca - composer, engineer, member of attributed artist, mixing, recorder, vocals (background)
Zach Danziger - drums, member of attributed artist
Christopher Davis - member of attributed artist, rap
Dee Town - audio production, member of attributed artist, vocals
Dino Fekaris - composer
Chris Gehringer - mastering
Jason Gleed - guitar, bass, keyboards, member of attributed artist
Mark Hoppus - composer
Rebecca Jones - member of attributed artist, primary artist, vocals (background)
Janice Karman - audio production, dialogue, executive producer, producer
Joey Katsaros - bass, keyboards, member of attributed artist
Dan "D Unit" Levine - package design
Bob Marley - composer
John McCurry - guitar, bass, member of attributed artist
Port O'Brien - composer
Richie Sambora - composer
Drew Seeley - guest artist, primary artist
John VanNest - engineer, recorder
Dave Wallace - drum, guitar, bass

Reception
Undeniable peaked at No. 78 on the Billboard 200 albums chart.

References

External links
Official Alvin and the Chipmunks Music Myspace 

2008 albums
Alvin and the Chipmunks albums
Razor & Tie albums